Boronia eriantha is a plant in the citrus family Rutaceae and is endemic to central Queensland, Australia. It is an erect shrub with many branches, leaves with up to nine leaflets, and white and red, four-petalled flowers.

Description
The leaflets are lance-shaped, with the narrower end towards the base and their undersides are mostly glabrous. The eight stamens have glandular hairs.

Taxonomy and naming
Boronia eriantha was first formally described in 1848 by John Lindley and the description was published in the journal Thomas Mitchell's Journal of an Expedition into the Interior of Tropical Australia. The specific epithet (eriantha) is derived from the ancient Greek words  meaning "wool" and  meaning "flower".

Distribution and habitat
This boronia grows in woodland and forest on sandstone in the Carnarvon Range and White Mountains National Park.

Conservation
Boronia eriantha is classed as "least concern" under the Queensland Government Nature Conservation Act 1992.

References 

eriantha
Flora of Queensland
Plants described in 1848
Taxa named by John Lindley